Dan Kaplan (born 1971) is a contemporary American poet.

Biography

Dan Kaplan is the author of 2.4.18 (Spuyten Duyvil, 2023), Instant Killer Wig (Spuyten Duyvil, 2018), Bill's Formal Complaint (The National Poetry Review Press, 2008), and the bilingual chapbook SKIN (Red Hydra Press, 2005). His work has appeared in publications including American Letters & Commentary, VOLT, Denver Quarterly, and the anthology Flash Fiction Forward (W. W. Norton & Co). He lives in Portland, Oregon.

References

External links
 Dan Kaplan's home page
 Dan Kaplan's author page at Spuyten Duyvil
 Dan Kaplan at Red Hydra Press's website

American male poets
1971 births
Living people
21st-century American poets
21st-century American male writers